Wata Fares, Ouata Fares,    is a village in Koura District of Lebanon. It has a mixed Maronite and Eastern Orthodox population.)

References

External links
 Majdel - Zakzouk - Ouata Fares,  Localiban

Eastern Orthodox Christian communities in Lebanon
Maronite Christian communities in Lebanon
Populated places in the North Governorate
Koura District